The International League of Esperantist Radio Amateurs (ILERA). It was founded in 1970. It organizes radio programs in Esperanto and publishes the ILERA bulletin.

Activities and practices

Likely frequencies for Esperanto conversations on the air are 1866, 3766, 7066, 14266, 28766 kHz for Voice (SSB), and 3640, 14166, 28266 kHz for CW, generally on weekends, according to Net Schedules published on the ILERA web site.

Every year ILERA organizes the Esperanto-contest. Date is the third Saturday and following Sunday in November. So this year: 2021 nov. 20 + 21

External links
 
  in Esperanto
 
 ILERA Google Group in use since late 2017

Amateur radio organizations